Metro Hearts is the debut mixtape by American actor and singer Leon Thomas III released on August 1, 2012 by Rostrum Records.

Track listing
All tracks written and produced by Leon Thomas III, except where noted.

Sample credits
 "Take Care" is a cover of the song of the same name by Drake featuring Rihanna, itself a reworking "I'll Take Care of You (Jamie xx Remix)" by Gil Scott-Heron.
 "Forever" contains samples from "My Only Swerving" by El Ten Eleven and "Ms. Jackson" by Outkast, as well as dialogue from the film The Notebook.

References

2012 debut albums
2012 mixtape albums
Leon Thomas III albums